Marasmius tenuissimus is a species of agaric fungus in the large agaric genus Marasmius.

See also
List of Marasmius species

References

Fungi described in 1838
Fungal plant pathogens and diseases
tenuissimus